Mechanics